Kiril Stankov Hristov (20 May 1949 – 7 May 1992) was an international Bulgarian footballer who played for CSKA Sofia as a defender. During his club career, he won the national Bulgarian league six times. Stankov died at the age of 42.

International career
At the age of 19, Stankov won the silver medal with the Bulgarian Olympic team at the 1968 Summer Olympics, where he featured in three games, including the final. Including these games, Stankov played twelve times for the senior national team.

Honours

Club
 Bulgarian A PFG (6): 1968–69, 1970–71, 1971–72, 1972–73, 1974–75, 1975–76
 Bulgarian Cup (4): 1969, 1972, 1973, 1974

Olympic
 Silver medal (1): 1968

References

External links
 

1949 births
1992 deaths
Bulgarian footballers
Bulgaria international footballers
Olympic footballers of Bulgaria
Olympic silver medalists for Bulgaria
Footballers at the 1968 Summer Olympics
PFC CSKA Sofia players
First Professional Football League (Bulgaria) players
Olympic medalists in football
Association football midfielders
Medalists at the 1968 Summer Olympics
Association football defenders